Liu Ying (born February 1974) is a Chinese writer of novels and short stories. Her work revolves around the exploration of women life in modern China in light of historical, political and economic changes. She published ten novels, and many short-stories. Her early novel, "The Attic", was adapted into a film with the same name.

Life
Liu was born in February 1974 in Longyou County, Zhejiang to a working-class family. She has an older sister and a younger brother.

In 2001, at the age of 27, Liu Ying suffered from depression and severe disc herniation. Being confined to close quarters for a long time Liu Ying began to write novels. A year later her collection of short stories "Attic" was published, become an instant hit and launched her writing career. In 2004 "Attic" was made into a Chinese motion picture and in 2006 Liu Ying published her first long novel "Ghost Tree".

In 2005 she joined China Writers Association and entered Lu Xun Literary Institute in Beijing. Later Liu Ying moved back to Zhejiang and settled in Hangzhou.

In 2014, Liu Ying, a single mom, took her six-year-old daughter, along with the first draft of "Sister", and immigrated to the United States to continue her literary career. "Sister" was published early 2019, and in less than two months was completely sold out and second editions were printed.

Writing style

Works

Recent Work 

Liu Ying is finishing up her next book, while some of her earlier work is being translated into English.

Liu Ying latest short story published in HongKong

Liu Ying self-published Kindle book

References

1974 births
Living people
Writers from Quzhou
21st-century Chinese women writers
21st-century Chinese writers
Chinese expatriates in the United States